Leicester Medical School is a medical school, which is part of the University of Leicester. The school was founded in 1975, although between 2000 and 2007 it was part of the joint Leicester-Warwick Medical School. As of 2021, the medical school admits 290 students per year including 18 students from overseas. Leicester was ranked 5th in the UK, among 33 medical schools in the 2020 Shanghai Ranking of World Universities. In the same rankings, Leicester was ranked 20th globally. Leicester Medical School is the first UK medical school to adopt a one-iPad-per-student programme at the undergraduate level, commencing in 2013. Leicester Medical School is one of the few UK medical schools offering full-body cadaveric dissection as part of their clinical teaching.

Course 

Leicester medical school offers a MBChB degree course in medicine as an undergraduate five-year course. Some students also adopt to take an intercalated BSc Honours Degree.
Leicester Medical school is the first medical school in the UK to teach e-consultations to students.

History
The school was formed following the recommendations of the Royal Commission on Medical Education (1965–68) (which issued its report, popularly known as the "Todd Report" in 1968).  The Commission estimated that by 1994 the UK would need to train more than 4500 doctors a year, and that this would need to be achieved by both increasing the numbers of medical students at existing medical schools, and by establishing a number of new medical schools.  It recommended the creation of new medical schools at the Universities of Nottingham, Southampton and Leicester.

In 2000, Leicester Medical School assisted the University of Warwick in the foundation of the Leicester-Warwick Medical School, combining Leicester's own school with a new institution based at the University of Warwick.  The project was successful, and in 2007, the two institutions separated, creating Warwick Medical School, and recreating Leicester Medical School.

In 2012, it was announced that Leicester Medical School was to be rebuilt. The £42 million new build began in 2013, and is expected to be completed in 2015. The building will be used by its first cohort of medical students in September 2016. Professor Stewart Petersen said that the reason for this rebuild was "We want to attract the best medical students. We’re also acutely aware that students want the best facilities and value for money when being charged £9,000 fees."

See also
Medical school in the United Kingdom

References

Medical schools in England
University of Leicester